Juan Jose García Rodriguez  (born 22 April 1989) is  a Dominican professional basketball player. He plays for the Dominican national basketball team and AB Castelló.

Professional career
García played for the C.B. Eurocolegio Casvi from 2008–2013. He moved to Oviedo CB in the 2013–14 season, he averaged 10.6 point, 6.2 rebounds and 1.6 assists. In the next season at Oviedo CB, he averaged 11.4 points, 6.8 rebounds and 1.7 assists. In 2015, he transferred to Basket Zaragoza, where he played 2 league games. He played the 2015–16 season at Bàsquet Manresa, where he averaged 3.9 points, 3.3 rebounds and 0.5 assist. He moved Unicaja Baloncesto Malaga to in the 2016–17 season, where he appeared in only 2 games of the season. He moved AB Castelló in the 2017–18 season, he averaged 7.5 points, 4.9 rebounds and 1.2 assists. In the 2018–19 season, he averaged 12.6 points, 8.1 rebounds and 2 assists. In the 2019–20 season, he is averaging 9.6 points, 6.3 rebounds and 2.3 assists.

National team career
García played for the Dominican national basketball team at the basketball event in the 2015 Pan American Games, where he averaged 3.3 point, 2 rebound and 0.3 assist. He participated in the 2015 FIBA Americas Championship, where he averaged 6 point, 4 rebound and 0.7 assist.  He also played in the 2016 Centrobasket, where he averaged 5.7 points, 3.8 rebound and 1.3 assists. He played in the 2019 FIBA Basketball World Cup in china, where he averaged 0.8 points, 1 rebound and 0.3 assist.

References

1989 births
Living people
AB Castelló players
Basket Zaragoza players
Bàsquet Manresa players
Dominican Republic men's basketball players
Power forwards (basketball)
Sportspeople from Santo Domingo
2019 FIBA Basketball World Cup players